Gabbianelli is an Italian ceramics company specializing in ceramic wall and floor tiles. It was founded in 1939 by Enrico Gabbianelli with its manufacturing plant in Cusano Milanino. During the 1960s and 70s it also produced a series of ceramic objects for the home by prominent Italian designers. The company was bought by Ceramica Bardelli in 1996, although the two companies maintained their own production and brand names. In 2000, following a further period of consolidation and restructuring in the Italian ceramics industry, Bardelli, Gabbianelli, and several other brands became subsidiaries of the Biella-based Altaeco Group.

Gio Ponti had a lengthy association with Gabbianelli while both Enzo Mari and Bruno Munari designed tiles for them in the 1970s when Gabbianelli was one of the first firms to introduce screen-printing into tile production.

Gabbianelli designers
Designers who have worked for Gabbianelli include:

Sergio Asti
Liisi Beckmann
Lucio Fontana
Enzo Mari
Marcello Morandini
Bruno Munari
Gaetano Pesce
Gio Ponti

References

External links

Confindustria Ceramica.  Gabbianelli – Altaeco S.p.A. 

Ceramics manufacturers of Italy
Companies based in Biella
Italian companies established in 1939